Wayne Fromm is a Canadian inventor and entrepreneur who is most notable for being the original patent holder of the selfie stick for digital cameras and cell phones. Branded as the Quik Pod, it is a handheld extendable stick for digital cameras and smart phones for taking pictures of one's self.

Biography
Wayne Fromm studied commerce and finance at the University of Toronto from 1972 to 1973. Subsequently in 1975, he received a Bachelor of Arts in Psychology at  York University in Toronto, Canada. Through his company Fromm Works, he has invented numerous inventions and his activities have been mentioned in notable media like the Entrepreneur Magazine, Inventor's Digest, Harvard Business Review, The Wall Street Journal, Investor's Daily News, CNN, Business Week, Toronto Star, Financial Post, Globe and Mail, New York Post and CTV Biography. During his career, he created devices like the Quik Pod which appeared in Oprah Magazine and the New York Times in March 2008.  Disney's Beauty and the Beast Magic Talking Mirror, Crayola's Colour and Show Projector, Saban's Power Ranger Room Defender, Nestle's Nesquik Magic Milkshake Maker.
The following patents below are credited to Wayne Fromm and describe some of his inventions:

See also
 Tripod
 List of people from Toronto

References

External links
 Fighting Copycats of new Selfie Gadget
 Fromm Works website
 Quik Pod website

1954 births
University of Toronto people
Living people